Pavlo Parshyn (born 5 August 1975, Soviet Union) is a retired professional Ukrainian football forward.

Parshyn became the highest scorer when he scored 17 goals for Polissya Zhytomyr during the 1999–2000 Ukrainian First League season.

References

External links

1975 births
Living people
Ukrainian footballers
Ukrainian Premier League players
FC Dynamo-2 Kyiv players
FC Nyva Vinnytsia players
FC Elektrometalurh-NZF Nikopol players
MFC Mykolaiv players
FC Chornohora Ivano-Frankivsk players
FC Hirnyk Kryvyi Rih players
FC Spartak Ivano-Frankivsk players
FC Polissya Zhytomyr players

Association football forwards